Korotyginskaya is a rural locality (a village) in Yavengskoye Rural Settlement, Vozhegodsky District, Vologda Oblast, Russia. The population was 58 as of 2002.

Geography 
Korotyginskaya is located 29 km northeast of Vozhega (the district's administrative centre) by road. Semenovskaya is the nearest rural locality.

References 

Rural localities in Vozhegodsky District